Fred M. Kaplan (born July 4, 1954) is an American author and journalist. His weekly "War Stories" column for Slate magazine covers international relations and U.S. foreign policy.

Biography
Kaplan was born in Hutchinson, Kansas, to Julius E. and Ruth (Gottfried) Kaplan. He received a bachelor's degree (1976) from Oberlin College and a Master of Science (1978) and Ph.D. (1983) in political science from the Massachusetts Institute of Technology. From 1978 to 1980, he was a foreign and defense policy adviser to U.S. Congressman Les Aspin (D, Wisconsin).

Before writing for Slate, Kaplan was a correspondent at the Boston Globe, reporting from Washington, D.C.; Moscow; and New York City. In 1982, he contributed to "War and Peace in the Nuclear Age," a Sunday Boston Globe Magazine special report on the U.S.-Soviet nuclear arms race that received the Pulitzer Prize for National Reporting in 1983. He has also written for other publications, including The New York Times, The Atlantic, The New Yorker, and Scientific American.

Kaplan has authored several books on military strategy. His 1983 book on the individuals who created American nuclear strategy in the late 1940s and '50s, The Wizards of Armageddon, won the Washington Monthly Political Book of the Year award. He published Daydream Believers in 2008, a work which analyzes the George W. Bush administration's use of Cold War tactics in post-9/11 military activities. He criticizes the administration for pursuing policies he believes to be unilateral and violate prohibitions on pre-emptive warfare. In late 2012, Kaplan published The Insurgents: David Petraeus and the Plot to Change the American Way of War, which examines how General David Petraeus attempted to implement new thinking in Afghanistan and Iraq regarding the traditional clear and hold counter-insurgency strategy, and the shortcomings of this strategy, its intellectual underpinnings, and the individuals who defined it. The book was a finalist for the Pulitzer Prize for General Nonfiction in 2014.

In 2009, Kaplan published 1959: The Year Everything Changed. The book argues that the course of world history was not changed by the counter-culture movements of the 1960s but rather by artistic, scientific, political, and economics events occurring in the year 1959.

Audio/video
Kaplan is an enthusiast of high-end audio and video equipment, and has reported from the Consumer Electronics Show on new technologies in this area, as well as penning shopping-advice columns on which new televisions offer the best value.

He has authored articles covering jazz and hi-fi equipment for the magazine Stereophile.

Family
Kaplan married Brooke Gladstone, a journalist, author and media analyst, in 1983. The couple has twin daughters.

Works
 Books
 Dubious Specter: A Skeptical Look at the Soviet Nuclear Threat, Institute for Policy Studies, 1980, 
 
 
 
 The Insurgents: David Petraeus and the Plot to Change the American Way of War, Simon and Schuster, 2013, 
 
 

 Select essays

References

Bibliography
 Contemporary Authors. Detroit: Gale Research Company, 1998.

External links
 Fred Kaplan's web site
 "War Stories" at Slate
 Fred Kaplan's jazz blog
 Video (and audio) of interview/discussion with Fred Kaplan by Robert Wright on Bloggingheads.tv

1954 births
American male journalists
Living people
MIT School of Humanities, Arts, and Social Sciences alumni
Oberlin College alumni
People from Hutchinson, Kansas
Pulitzer Prize for National Reporting winners
Slate (magazine) people